Chris Crass (born c. 1973) is an American anarchist, activist, and writer on topics of anti-racist and feminist organizing.

Political activism

In high school, Chris Crass's best friend introduced him to anarchist politics and punk rock. Crass attended San Francisco State University and was an active organizer in the area's Food Not Bombs chapter from 1993 to 2000. In the 2000s and early 2010s, he was an organizer for immigrant rights.

Personal life 

Crass is also a Unitarian Universalist. He lives in Tennessee, with his partner and child.

Selected works 

 
 
 Towards Collective Liberation: Anti-Racist Organizing, Feminist Praxis and Movement Building Strategy (2013)

See also

 Joel Olson

References

1970s births
Living people
American anarchists
American Unitarian Universalists
American anti-racism activists
Male feminists
San Francisco State University alumni
American social justice activists
Feminist musicians